The Third Republic of Vietnam, abbreviated as the DTVNCH, also referred to its former name as the Provisional National Government of Vietnam, is a self-proclaimed government in exile, headquartered in Orange County and other Little Saigon communities. This organization is listed as one of the reactionary, ROV-istic and also a terrorist organization as stated by the Ministry of Public Security of Vietnam.

History

The Provisional National Government of Vietnam was formed by former soldiers and refugees from the former South Vietnamese regime on 21 October 1990 and was officially founded on 16 February 1991, led by "Prime Minister" Đào Minh Quân, who was elected by some of the Vietnamese representatives in the United States. He succeeded Nguyen Tran who was elected as Prime Minister previously. It was ruled by the New Democratic Party of Vietnam.

In November 2018, "Prime Minister" Đào Minh Quân was reelected as the new President of the newly created "Third Republic of Vietnam". The inauguration ceremony was held at the base in Adelanto and at the Hilton Hotel. Participants came from numerous countries, including Australia and Vietnam (see Anti-communism in Vietnam). During the ceremony, the US government's staff gave speeches and expressed hope that the newly elected President would work closely with the US. Also in the same year, the Vietnamese government listed this foundation as a terrorist foundation, citing the reason due to the 2018 bombings.

Activities

Attempted terrorist attacks 
In January 2018, the government in exile was labeled by the Vietnamese Ministry of Public Security as a "terrorist organization", citing the group responsibility in numerous plans to commit acts of terrorism, sabotage, and assassination of government officials.

People affiliated with the organization have been arrested and convicted in Vietnam of operations to overthrow the Vietnamese Government after an attempted arson and bombing at a police facility and an airport (presumably Tan Son Nhat Intl.) which was unsuccessful. Officials have charged several political activists, resulting in prison sentences of up to 14 years.

See also 
 Government of Free Vietnam

References 

1990 establishments in California
Political parties established in 1990
Organizations based in Orange County, California
Politics of Vietnam
Proposed countries
Vietnamese democracy movements
Anti-communism in Vietnam
Anti-communist organizations in the United States
Governments in exile
National liberation movements
Organizations established in 1990
Overseas Vietnamese organizations in the United States
Vietnamese anti-communists
South Vietnam